Arcenio León (born September 22, 1986) is a Venezuelan professional baseball pitcher who is a free agent. He has played for the Detroit Tigers of Major League Baseball (MLB) in 2017.

Career
León began his professional career with the Houston Astros organization. The Milwaukee Brewers claimed him off of waivers in 2012. He spent the 2015 season in the Chicago White Sox organization, but lost sensation in his hand, requiring surgery. He pitched for the Acereros de Monclova of the Mexican League in 2016.

León signed with the Detroit Tigers after the 2016 season. He pitched for the Venezuelan national baseball team in the 2017 World Baseball Classic. He began the 2017 season with the Toledo Mud Hens of the Class AAA International League. León posted a 3.15 earned run average in 21 appearances for Toledo before the Tigers purchased his contract on May 27. He made his major league debut the following day. The Tigers optioned León back to Toledo on June 11. On January 29, 2018, León signed with the Guerreros de Oaxaca of the Mexican Baseball League. He was released on July 3, 2018. 

On August 15, 2018, León signed with the Leones de Yucatán of the Mexican League. He became a free agent following the season. 

On February 19, 2019, León signed with the Piratas de Campeche of the Mexican League. He was released on May 27, 2019. 

On March 5, 2021, León signed with the West Virginia Power of the Atlantic League of Professional Baseball. In 11 appearances, he posted a 1–0 record with a 3.55 ERA over 12.2 innings pitched. He was released on August 28, 2021.

References

External links

1986 births
Living people
Acereros de Monclova players
Águilas del Zulia players
Charlotte Knights players
Corpus Christi Hooks players
Detroit Tigers players
Greeneville Astros players
Guerreros de Oaxaca players
Leones de Yucatán players
Lexington Legends players
Huntsville Stars players
Major League Baseball pitchers
Major League Baseball players from Venezuela
Mexican League baseball pitchers
Nashville Sounds players
Oklahoma City RedHawks players
Piratas de Campeche players
Sportspeople from Maracaibo
Toledo Mud Hens players
Venezuelan expatriate baseball players in Mexico
Venezuelan expatriate baseball players in the United States
Venezuelan Summer League Astros players
World Baseball Classic players of Venezuela
2017 World Baseball Classic players